Craspedortha porphyria is a species of moth of the family Sphingidae.

Distribution 
It is known from Nepal, north-eastern India, Myanmar, southern China, and south to Vietnam and central Thailand. It is also known from Java.

Description 
The wingspan is about 60 mm. The ground colour of the forewing upperside consists of shades of brown and pale grey with pale purple highlights. There is a dark, roughly pentagonal patch found on the median area.

The larvae have been recorded feeding on Vitex canescens in Laos and Thailand.

Subspecies
Craspedortha porphyria porphyria (Nepal, north-eastern India, Myanmar, southern China, and south to Vietnam and central Thailand)
Craspedortha porphyria basale (Dupont, 1937) (Java)

References

Smerinthini
Moths described in 1876